The Wall of the Ferme générale was one of the several city walls of Paris built between the early Middle Ages and the mid 19th century. Built between 1784 and 1791, the 24 km wall crossed the districts of the Place de l'Étoile, Batignolles, Pigalle, Belleville, Nation, the Place d'Italie, Denfert-Rochereau, Montparnasse and the Trocadéro, roughly following the route now traced by line 2 and line 6 of the Paris Métro. The wall was demolished in the early 1860s, although elements of some of its gates remain.

History
Unlike earlier walls, the Farmers-General Wall was not intended to defend Paris from invaders but to enforce the payment of a toll on goods entering Paris ("octroi"). It was commissioned by the nobleman and scientist Antoine Lavoisier on behalf of the Ferme générale (General Farm), a tax farming corporation that paid the French State for the right to collect (and keep) certain taxes. Lavoisier was a shareholder and Administrator of the Ferme générale and determined that the cost of building, staffing, and maintaining the wall would be compensated by better revenue collection. The wall's tax-collection function made it very unpopular: a play on words of the time went "Le mur murant Paris rend Paris murmurant" ("The wall walling Paris keeps Paris murmuring") There was also an epigram:

The Wall was five meters high and 24 km long, following the then-boundaries of the city of Paris. No buildings could be erected within 98 meters of its exterior or within 11 meters of its interior. The outside of the wall was flanked by boulevards. Along the inside, surveillance by customs officials was facilitated by a raised protected walkway (chemin de ronde), except between the barrière d'Italie (now the Place d'Italie) and the barrière d’Enfer (now the Place Denfert-Rochereau).  Architect Claude Nicolas Ledoux designed its 62 toll gates (barrières) in a neo-classical or even classical style. The Parisian writer (and tax critic) Louis-Sébastien Mercier, who witnessed the construction, dubbed the buildings "dens of the Tax Department metamorphosed into palaces with columns." The Finance Minister. Loménie de Brienne, in 1787 worried about the very high cost of the construction and considered stopping the work, but never actually did so because it was so far advanced. 

In the early years of the French Revolution, with the Wall scarcely finished, tax farming and the toll on goods were abolished. But in 1798 French municipalities were granted the octroi, which soon became their primary source of revenue. The city of Paris consequently took responsibility for maintaining the Wall and staffing its revenue officials. When in 1860 the suburban communes were annexed to Paris, the customs boundary moved out to the Thiers fortifications, with duties collected at its numerous gates (portes). Under Haussmann's auspices the Wall of the Ferme générale was quickly demolished and a series of boulevards constructed over its path. Municipal customs duties were collected until the 1940s.

Current remains
Some portions of the wall still exist, such as the rotunda of the Barrier of La Villette (now Place de Stalingrad), the Barrière du Trône (now Place de la Nation), the Barrière d'Enfer (now Place Denfert-Rochereau), and the rotunda of Parc Monceau. The wall itself was replaced by the route of the following streets:
On the left (south) bank of the Seine from the east: Boulevard Vincent-Auriol, Auguste-Blanqui, Boulevard Saint-Jacques, Boulevard Raspail, Boulevard Edgar-Quinet, Boulevard de Vaugirard, Boulevard Pasteur, Boulevard Garibaldi and Boulevard de Grenelle.
On the right (north) bank, from the west: Rue de l'Alboni, Rue Benjamin-Franklin, Avenue d'Iéna, Avenue Kléber, Rue La Pérouse, Rue de Presbourg, Rue de Tilsitt, Avenue de Wagram, Boulevard de Courcelles, Boulevard des Batignolles, Clichy, Boulevard de Rochechouart, Boulevard de la Chapelle, Boulevard de la Villette, Boulevard de Belleville, Boulevard de Ménilmontant, Boulevard de Charonne, Boulevard de Picpus, Boulevard de Reuilly and Boulevard de Bercy.

References

Bibliography

 
 
 
 

Taxation in France
City walls in France
Fortifications of Paris
Ferme générale